In God We Trust is the second album from hip hop group Brand Nubian. It was released on February 2, 1993, by Elektra.

Background
Lead MC Grand Puba left the group to pursue a solo career in 1991, following the release of their revered debut One for All. DJ Alamo also left to work with Puba, leaving MC's Sadat X and Lord Jamar, who enlisted DJ Sincere to join the group. Lyrically, the album contains extremely militant content that reflects the group's identity as Five Percenters, adhering to the philosophy of the Nation of Gods and Earths.

Reception
The album was less successful than the group's debut but still received strong reviews. The single "Punks Jump Up to Get Beat Down" became a Billboard Hot 100 hit, but was met with controversy over homophobic content, referencing the Sadat X line "Though I can freak, fly, flow, fuck up a faggot/I don't understand their ways, I ain't down with gays." The single "Love Me or Leave Me Alone" was also a Hot-100 hit.

Track listing
All tracks produced by Brand Nubian, except track 14 produced by Diamond D

Charts

References

1993 albums
Brand Nubian albums
Albums produced by Diamond D
Elektra Records albums